Eriopithex is a genus of moths in the family Geometridae first described by Warren in 1896.

Species
Eriopithex ishigakiensis (Inoue, 1971)
Eriopithex lanaris Warren, 1896
Eriopithex recensitaria (Walker, 1862)

References

Eupitheciini